Jeong Myeong-hui (born 2 May 1966) is a South Korean pharmacist-turned politician serving as the mayor of Buk District of Busan and its first woman mayor from July 2018.

Jeong, along with Busanjin District Mayor Seo Eunsuk and Geumjeong District Mayor Jeong Mi-yeong, was elected as the first woman mayor of their respective district in Busan in the 2018 election where 13 out of 16 autonomous districts/counties including Buk-gu have their first mayors not from People Power Party or its preceding parties.

In the 2014 election, Jeong was placed as the number 2 of Democratic Party's proportional list for Busan Metropolitan Council. During four years from 2014 to 2018, she served as the only democratic member of the Council.

In the 2018 election, she defeated two-term Mayor of the district, Hwang Jae-gwan from the main opposition party.

Jeon was previously vice chair of Democratic Party's Policy Planning Committee and the spokesperson of Busan branch of the party. She was also active in civil societies serving as a board member of Busan Pharmaceutical Association from 2011 to 2014 and the president of its Jung District branch from 2012 to 2016.

Jeong holds two degrees in Pharmacy - a bachelor from Pusan National University and a master's from Kyungsung University where she also completed a doctorate programme.

Electoral history

References 

Living people
1966 births
People from Gyeongju
Pusan National University alumni
Minjoo Party of Korea politicians
Mayors of places in South Korea
21st-century South Korean women politicians
21st-century South Korean politicians
Buk District, Busan
Kyungsung University alumni
South Korean pharmacists